Communications Physics is a peer-reviewed, open access, scientific journal in the field physics published by Nature Portfolio since 2018. The chief editor is Elena Belsole. Communications Physics was created as a sub-journal to Nature Communications along with Communications Biology and Communications Chemistry.

Abstracting and indexing 
The journal is abstracted and indexed in:

According to the Journal Citation Reports, the journal has a 2021 impact factor of 6.497, ranking it 16th out of 86 journals in the category "Physics, Multidisciplinary".

See also
Nature
Nature Communications
Scientific Reports

References

External links

Nature Research academic journals
Physics journals
Open access journals
Publications established in 2018
English-language journals
Creative Commons-licensed journals
Continuous journals